Moča (Hungarian pronunciation:) is a village and municipality in the Komárno District in the Nitra Region of south-western Slovakia.

Geography
The village lies at an altitude of 110 metres and covers an area of 17.991 km².
It has a population of about 1,170 people.

History
In the 9th century, the territory of Moča became part of the Great Moravia. In historical records the village was first mentioned in 1208.
After the Austro-Hungarian army disintegrated in November 1918, Czechoslovak troops entered the area, later acknowledged internationally by the Treaty of Trianon. Between 1938 and 1945 Moča was occupied by Miklós Horthy's Hungary through the First Vienna Award. From 1945 until the Velvet Divorce, it was part of Czechoslovakia. Since then it has been part of Slovakia.

Sights 

 Village Museum – We can see an excellent ethnographic and regional collectionin this Museum, and according to the interest the exhibition can be completed also with interactive programs. The visitors can discover the colourful and rich world of the old peasant culture.   The present exhibition deals with four themes:
 The development of the population and the village history
 Important personalities of the village
 The ship-mills, millars on the River Danube
 The Statue of Lilla – the work of the sculptor Gyula Mag from the year 2009. The statue is a memory of the poet, Mihály Csokonai Vitéz's love, Lilla. She got to the village Moča through her second marriage.
The Reformed Church – built in the Classicist style between 1856 and 1860. Previously, the Reformed had a house of prayer and a bell tower in the village. The tower of the church was destroyed in 1945 and restored by 1956. One of the largest Reformed churches in Slovakia.
The Statue of St. John Nepomuk – a copy of the 18th century statue of St. John of Nepomuk, destroyed in 1945, by Gyula Mag, was inaugurated on May 16, 2009, on the Süttő promenade.

Actively 

 Eurovelo 6 bicycle tour from Komárno to Kravany nad Dunajom between Moča.

Demographics
The village is about 92% Hungarian, 6% Slovak and 1.5% Romany with 0.5% other minorities.

Facilities
The village has a public library, a gym and a  football pitch.

References

External links 
 https://www.visitdanube.eu/en/sights-3

Villages and municipalities in the Komárno District
Hungarian communities in Slovakia
Populated places on the Danube